Avan Chandiyude Makan is a 2007 Indian Malayalam-language film produced by Nirmal Roy G M, written by Babu Janardhanan and directed by Thulasidas. The film stars Prithviraj Sukumaran and Vijayaraghavan with a musical score by Sanjeev Lal. This film was released along with the Tamil film Pokkiri.

Plot synopsis
Chandy, an adamant, unsocial father of a Christian family that lives in Central Travancore, is against the new thinking of the new generation in the family.

Cast
Prithviraj Sukumaran as Kurien Chandy Sebastian
Vijayaraghavan as Thattekkadu Chandy Outha Sebastian
Sridevika as Sobha Pillai
Usha as Kochurani Chandy Sebastian
 Rekha as Aleykutty Chandy Sebastian
Sona Nair as Susanna Chandy Sebastian
Augustine as Kuncheria
Anil Murali as Sub Inspector Hari
P. Sreekumar as Constable Somanathan Pillai
Kalasala Babu as Peralithanam Kunjukochu
Baburaj as Peralithanam Sonichen
Kundara Johny as Bhargavan M.L.A.
Shobha Mohan as Vasundhara
Sadiq as Paul Chacko
Aniyappan as Azhakappan
Cochin Haneefa as Chackochi
Narayanankutty as Prahladan
Spadikam George as Circle Inspector Shivanadan
Captain Raju - Parish priest
Vakkom Jayalal - Cameo Appearance

Soundtrack
The music was composed by Sanjeev Lal and shot in Kochi and Karnataka. lyrics were written by Gireesh Puthenchery.

References

External links
 

2007 films
2000s Malayalam-language films
Films directed by Thulasidas